Carlos Lopez (May 24, 1908 – January 6, 1953) was a Havana-born early 20th century American artist, recognized for his New Deal-era murals in Michigan, Illinois, and Washington, D.C.

Highly regarded in his own time, although considered “forgotten” by the 1990s, Lopez worked extensively for the War Department during World War II and was published in Life magazine. His work was included in the American Paintings Today show at the Metropolitan Museum of Art in 1950.

His work is in the collections of the Detroit Institute of Art, the University of Michigan Museum of Art (UMMA), and the Henry Ford Museum.

After being raised mostly in Spain and immigrating to the United States in 1919 with his mother and siblings, Carlos Lopez first worked at the Ford Rouge River Plant. He studied for three years at the Detroit Art Academy, as well as at the Art Institute of Chicago, and with Leon Makielski. 

Lopez was married to the sculptor and medical illustrator Rhoda LaBlanc Lopez. He was remembered by his son as a devoted family man yet “an obsessed painter who spent most every day either teaching or working on his art. His health was never great, and he was nearly deaf for much of his adult life.”

He taught art at the University of Michigan from 1945 until his death in 1953. He was remembered for often telling his students, "I can teach you to draw, but I cannot teach you to be an artist."

Further reading 

 Chidester, Cheryl Ann, "The Documentation and Preservation of Art-in-Architecture of Michigan: The Section of Fine Arts Projects" (2007). Master's Theses and Doctoral Dissertations. Paper 172.

References 

1908 births
1953 deaths
American muralists
Section of Painting and Sculpture artists
20th-century American male artists
Artists from Michigan